Thunder is a Swiss drama film, directed by Carmen Jaquier and slated for release in 2022. The film stars Lilith Grasmug as Elisabeth, a young woman who has spent several years in a convent school preparing to take vocation as a nun, but finds that her desires have changed when she returns home following the death of her older sister.

Jaquier has described the film as inspired by the discovery of old notebooks belonging to her great-grandmother, which revealed details about her daily life and her relationship to God.

The film premiered in the Platform Prize program at the 2022 Toronto International Film Festival on September 10, 2022, and will be screened in the New Directors lineup at the 70th San Sebastián International Film Festival.

References

External links 
 

2022 films
2022 drama films
Swiss drama films